The 2019–20 season is Colón's 6th consecutive season in the top division of Argentine football. In addition to the Primera División, the club are competing in the Copa Argentina, Copa de la Superliga and Copa Sudamericana.

The season generally covers the period from 1 July 2019 to 30 June 2020.

Review

Pre-season
Colón started their pre-season campaign with defeat at the hands of Gimnasia y Esgrima (J) of Primera B Nacional on 22 June 2019, with Diego López notching the only goal of the game. They played one further fixture with Gimnasia that day, running out 4–0 winners at the Estadio Padre Ernesto Martearena; Mateo Hernández notched a brace. Two new signings were confirmed in the week commencing 24 June, as Gastón Díaz joined from Vélez Sarsfield while Rodrigo Aliendro made a move from Atlético Tucumán. Gustavo Toledo left as part of the Aliendro deal, agreeing terms with Atlético Tucumán on 28 June. A third and fourth exhibition match was played on 29 June, as Colón held Newell's Old Boys to a draw in game one before winning the second thanks to Nicolás Leguizamón.

Cristian Guanca (Al-Ettifaq) and Juan Bauza (Gimnasia y Esgrima (M) respective loans away from last season officially ended on 30 June. On 2 July, Guanca returned to Saudi Arabia on a permanent contract with Al-Shabab. Lucas Acevedo, from recently relegated San Martín, signed for Colón on 4 July. Patronato's Cristian Tarragona condemned Colón to a friendly loss on 5 July.

July
Colón, on 11 July, opened their competitive schedule with defeat after losing to league rivals Argentinos Juniors in the first leg of a Copa Sudamericana round of sixteen tie, following a strike from Matías Romero after thirty-eight minutes on home soil. The two teams met again on 17 July, with Colón equalling the scores on aggregate with a 0–1 win. Christian Bernardi's goal sent it to penalties, which saw them come out 3–4 victors. On 22 July, Gonzalo Bueno joined Almería. Mauro Da Luz, a Uruguayan midfielder from his homeland's River Plate, penned a loan contract on 23 July. Federico Lértora moved to Colón from Belgrano on 25 July. Colón faced Patronato in their opening fixture of the Primera División on 27 July, coming away with a loss after a Christian Chimino goal.

On 25 July, Franco Zuculini departed to Venezia of Italy's Serie B. 29 July saw Juan Bauza sign with Górnik Zabrze of Poland's Ekstraklasa.

August
August began with a second successive defeat in the Primera División, as a trip to Huracán ended 2–0 in favour of the hosts. Zulia, in a quarter-final tie in the Copa Sudamericana, gained a first leg advantage after Abel Casquete struck to defeat Colón on 8 August. Colón advanced to the Copa Sudamericana semi-finals on 15 August, as they struck four goals at the Estadio Brigadier General Estanislao López to overturn the first leg deficit against Venezuela's Zulia; who finished the contest with nine men. A brace from Wilson Morelo gave Colón their first league victory of 2019–20, as they defeated Gimnasia y Esgrima (LP) on 19 August. Belgrano revealed, on 23 August, that they and Colón had agreed a deal for Lucas Acosta in the preceding months, though Acosta rejected the move.

A 2–0 beating at the Estadio Libertadores de América to Independiente on 24 August meant Colón suffered their third league loss in four games. Colón put four goals past Sol de Mayo in the Copa Argentina on 28 August, as they progressed to the round of sixteen.

September
Colón drew at home to Rosario Central in the Primera División on 1 September, with Rodrigo Aliendro netting the host's goal. Colón completed the signing of Jorge Ortega from Olimpia on 2 September.

Squad

Transfers
Domestic transfer windows:3 July 2019 to 24 September 201920 January 2020 to 19 February 2020.

Transfers in

Transfers out

Loans in

Loans out

Friendlies

Pre-season
A three-team friendly tournament, named Cementerio de los Elefantes, was planned to take place at the end of June with Independiente and San Lorenzo but was later scrapped. On 14 June 2019, Colón announced a pre-season training camp would take place in Salta, with the club arranging a friendly fixtures at the Estadio 23 de Agosto against Gimnasia y Esgrima (J) of Primera B Nacional. A day later, Patronato revealed a match with Colón. On 29 June, Colón would face friendlies with Newell's Old Boys.

Competitions

Primera División

League table

Relegation table

Source: AFA

Results summary

Matches
The fixtures for the 2019–20 campaign were released on 10 July.

Copa Argentina

Colón would face Sol de Mayo in the Copa Argentina round of thirty-two on 28 August 2019. After convincingly beating the Torneo Federal A outfit, they were then paired with Atlético Tucumán.

Copa de la Superliga

Copa Sudamericana

Colón's round of sixteen opponents in the Copa Sudamericana were revealed to be fellow Argentine Primera División team Argentinos Juniors. After advancing through that round, they were drawn with Venezuelan outfit Zulia. In the semi-finals, Colón would meet Brazilian outfit Atlético Mineiro.

Squad statistics

Appearances and goals

Statistics accurate as of 1 September 2019.

Goalscorers

Notes

References

Club Atlético Colón seasons
Colón